Wharfedale is a Chinese audio equipment manufacturer best known for loudspeakers. It is currently part of the International Audio Group.

Wharfedale also used to brand televisions, DVD players, set-top boxes and Hi-Fi players. Since 2008, they have only manufactured and sold audio equipment.

History

Wharfedale Wireless Works was founded in 1932 by Gilbert Briggs, and became one of Britain's leading manufacturers of audiophile equipment, particularly loudspeakers. In addition to winning awards by groups such as the Bradford Radio Society, in mass public testing at Carnegie Hall Wharfedale speakers proved indistinguishable from live music. Innovations introduced by Wharfedale under Briggs included such basics as the two-way loudspeaker and the ceramic magnet. 
In the 1950s and 1960s, Wharfedale became famous for its technique of eliminating cabinet resonances by using a double cabinet, with the space between the inner and outer shells filled with sand. Purchasers of the loudspeaker systems would receive the appropriate quantity of sand which had been shipped from Wharfedale in England. (Wharfedale in Yorkshire is the site of numerous sand quarries). Briggs sold the company to the Rank Organisation in 1958, and it has been through several owners since then.

Licensing of Wharfedale name
Beginning in 2008, the brand name was licensed to Argos for the manufacture of electronics products without loudspeakers for the UK market only. 
Wharfedale-branded speakers are still made by the original firm.

Manufacturing
The original manufacturing site was located in Idle, a district of Bradford, West Yorkshire.  The current manufacturing site is in Ji'an in China. (Locals in the area who are native to the district speak of being "born Idle").

References

External links 

 

Loudspeaker manufacturers
Audio equipment manufacturers of the United Kingdom
Manufacturing companies based in Bradford
Electronics companies established in 1932
British brands
1932 establishments in England